Jakub Landovský (born on 5 September 1976), is a Czech politician, lawyer, and university pedagogue, who is currently an ambassador to NATO since 5 August 2019. He had served as the Deputy Minister of Defense from 2015 to 2019.

He is a member of the CSSD since 2006.

Biography

Jakub Landovský was born in Prague on 5 September 1976.

From 1996 to 2003, he attended graduated with a bachelor's and subsequently a master's degree from the Institute of Political Science, Faculty of Social Sciences, Charles University in Prague (he obtained the degree of Mgr.)

From 1999 to 2007 he attended and graduated from the Faculty of Law of the University of West Bohemia in Pilsen (he obtained the degree of Mgr.)

In 2000, he started working at the Ministry of Foreign Affairs of the Czech Republic - first, until 2002 he was an assistant to the Special Rapporteur on Human Rights in the former Yugoslavia Jiří Dienstbier, and subsequently, until 2005, he was an assistant ambassador with a special mission.

From 2005 to 2006, he worked as a researcher at Oregon State University in the United States, and was briefly a consultant to the United Nations Development Program.

He completed his doctoral studies at the same faculty from 2003 to 2011 (he obtained a Ph.D.), and in 2009 he successfully passed the state rigorous examination (he obtained a PhDr.).

Landovský has been a member of the CSSD since 2006.

From 2007 to 2010, he advised the Chairman of the Foreign Affairs Committee of the Chamber of Deputies, preparing analyzes and background materials for him.

In February 2012, together with Jiří Dienstbier Jr., he published call Živá socdem, which criticized the clientelistic conditions in the Prague CSSD. During the campaign before the election of the President of the Czech Republic in 2013, Dienstbier Jr. was the speaker.

Between 2008 and 2013, Marek Legal was a trainee lawyer.

In 2014, he became an adviser to the Deputy Minister of Defense of the Czech Republic, preparing analyzes of legislative proposals of the Ministry of Defense of the Czech Republic and acting on behalf of the Deputy Minister of Defense.

Since 2014 he has been lecturing at the Faculty of Social Sciences, Charles University in Prague.

After passing the bar exam he became a lawyer in 2014 and until 2015 he worked at AK Landovský.

On 2 March 2015, Landovský was appointed Deputy Minister of Defense of the Czech Republic, working with Martin Stropnický for managing the Defense Policy and Strategy Section. He also worked for the Ministry of Defense of the Czech Republic under Karel Šlechtová and continues to work under Lubomír Metnar.

In the municipal elections in 2018, he was the leader of the CSSD candidate for the Prague City Council and therefore also the party's candidate for the Mayor of Prague.

The party however did not get into the council at all. He also failed an election in Prague 1.

On 5 August 2019, he left the position of Deputy Minister of Defense of the Czech Republic and became the new Ambassador of the Czech Republic to NATO, replacing Jiří Šedivý.

Family

Landovský is married and has three children. In his spare time, he enjoys road cycling and basketball. He is a member of the Czech Bar Association and the Council for International Relations. He is the son of the artist and dissident Pavel Landovský.

References

1976 births
Living people
21st-century Czech politicians
Politicians from Prague
Charles University alumni
Permanent Representatives of the Czech Republic to NATO